Kris Porter (born September 13, 1978) is a Canadian former professional ice hockey forward who played most of his career in the ECHL and WCHL.

Early life and education
Stringer was born in Oxbow, Saskatchewan and later moved to Wynyard, Saskatchewan. He played for a midget level team in his small town throughout high school. Porter played defense until age 15, when he moved to forward. There he was a prolific goal scorer. After high school Porter played junior hockey for the Weyburn Red Wings. In his last year of junior hockey he led the Saskatchewan Junior Hockey League in scoring.

Though he received offers from Ivy League programs Porter attended Merrimack College and played there from 1995 to 1999. Though he initially lacked skating skill compared to his teammates in his first season, by his sophomore year Porter had greatly improved and shared the team's Most Improved Player award with Rejean Stringer. He led the team in goals scored in the 1996–97 season and led the team in overall scoring the next two years. In the 1997–98 season he scored the second most goals in the nation. In one game that season he scored 4 goals in a 9-1 victory over Air Force. While at Merrimack he spent four consecutive seasons on the Hockey East All-Academic team.

Professional career
After leaving Merrimack, Stringer played three games for the Worcester IceCats of the AHL in the 1998–99 season. In the 1999–2000 he split his time between the Kentucky Thoroughblades of the AHL and the New Orleans Brass and Johnstown Chiefs of the ECHL. The next year, he moved to the Fresno Falcons of the now-defunct WCHL. Porter played a key role in Fresno's 2003 playoff run. He played for Fresno for six seasons before retiring from professional hockey.

Career statistics

References

External links
Kris Porter statistics at Hockeydb.com

1978 births
Canadian ice hockey forwards
Ice hockey people from Saskatchewan
Living people
Merrimack Warriors men's ice hockey players
People from Oxbow, Saskatchewan
Worcester IceCats players
Kentucky Thoroughblades players
New Orleans Brass players
Johnstown Chiefs players
Fresno Falcons players
People from Wynyard, Saskatchewan
Canadian expatriate ice hockey players in the United States